Porto Inglês (Portuguese for "English port", also: Cidade do Maio, Vila do Maio) is a city in the southwestern part of the island of Maio in southeastern Cape Verde. It is the main urban settlement of the island, and also seat of the Maio Municipality. Its population was 2,971 in 2010. The name Porto Inglês refers to English ships that exported salt produced on the island of Maio from this town. Salt exploitation continued until the 19th century. The inconclusive Battle of Maio was fought between British and French frigate squadrons close to the town on 23 January 1814 in the last stages of the Napoleonic Wars.

The port of Porto Inglês has ferry services to Praia on the island of Santiago. The domestic Maio Airport lies 1 km north of the city.

Landmarks: 
Forte de São José and its adjacent lighthouse
The Nossa Senhora da Luz (Our Lady of Light) church, opened in 1872
Salinas of the English Port

Historical population

City twinning
 Loures, Portugal

See also
List of cities and towns in Cape Verde
Tourism in Cape Verde

References

Cities in Cape Verde
Municipal seats in Cape Verde
Maio
Maio
Ports and harbours of Cape Verde